War of secession may refer to:

 War of independence, a military attempt by a rebel movement to have a territory break away (secede) from a sovereign state to form a new sovereign state in its own right
 American Civil War (1861–1865), see also names of the American Civil War
 Swedish War of Liberation (1521–1523), also known as the Swedish War of Secession or Gustav Vasa's Rebellion

See also 
 War of succession, a war prompted by a succession crisis in which two or more individuals claim the right of successor to a deceased or deposed monarch